Theodoros Mitras (1948 – 12 January 2021) was a Greek politician who served as a Member of Parliament.

References

1948 births
2021 deaths
Greek MPs 1993–1996
People from Katerini
New Democracy (Greece) politicians